Hypospila pseudobolinoides is a species of moth in the family Erebidae. It is found on the Solomon Islands.

References

Moths described in 1979
Hypospila
Moths of the Solomon islands